Neo Wave is the second album by the British power pop band Silver Sun, released in 1998. It contains a cover version of the Johnny Mathis and Deniece Williams number-one US hit "Too Much, Too Little, Too Late".

The album reached No. 74 in the UK albums chart. Two singles reached the UK Top 40: "Too Much, Too Little, Too Late" (No. 20) and "I'll See You Around" (No. 26).

Critical reception
The Sunday Mirror wrote: "Quirky guitar spankers with funny shades and a Johnny Mathis fixation mix the fast ones with the slow ones for a golden blend of fine roast pop." The Independent thought that "with their huge guitar riffs and layers of harmonies, these Midlanders offer a refreshing take on classic 1980s American rawk with a tongue-in-cheek dab of Queen's pomposity and a nod to the power-pop excellence of Cheap Trick."

AllMusic thought that "Silver Sun have created a disc that is a blatant throwback to mid-70s power-pop ... and while at times the formula works, it often falls flat."

Track listing
"Cheerleading" (James Broad, Lee Collard) – 4:03
"I'll See You Around" (Broad) – 3:32
"Would've if I Could've" (Broad, Collard) – 2:45
"Too Much, Too Little, Too Late" (N.Kipner, J.Vallins) – 3:59
"Scared" (Broad, Collard) – 3:01
"There Goes Summer" (Broad) – 2:42
"Sharks" (Broad, Collard) – 4:16
"The Profit on the Prairie" (Richard Kane) – 1:23
"Mustard" (Broad, Collard) – 3:00
"Pixie, Pixie" (Broad, Collard) – 3:27
"Hey Girl Friend" (Broad, Collard) – 2:51
"Only a Girl" (Broad, Collard) – 2:59
"Special Powers" (Broad) – 3:04
"Fire & Blood" (Broad) – 1:06
"Patients" (Broad, Collard) – 2:48
"Dead End" (Broad) – 2:48

Personnel
James Broad - lead vocals, guitar, saxophone
Paul Smith - guitar
Richard Buckton - bass, piano, vocals
Richard Sayce - drums, vocals
Al Clay - producer
Bob Ludwig - mastering

References

Silver Sun albums
1998 albums
Polydor Records albums